Unaisi Tagabale is a Fijian rugby union player. She made her international debut for Fiji on 9 July 2022 against Papua New Guinea at Massey Park. She came off the bench and scored a try in her sides 152–0 trouncing of the Cassowaries.

Tagabale was named in the Fijiana squad for the 2022 Oceania Championship in New Zealand. After her debut, she also featured in the match against Samoa.

References 

Year of birth missing (living people)
Living people
Female rugby union players
Fijian female rugby union players
Fiji women's international rugby union players